Trypanaxidae is an extinct family of fossil sea snails, marine gastropod molluscs in the superfamily Campaniloidea.

According to the taxonomy of the Gastropoda by Bouchet & Rocroi (2005), the family Trypanaxidae has no subfamilies.

Genera 
Genera within the family Trypanaxidae include:
 † Trypanaxis Cossmann, 1889 - the type genus
 † Alocaxis Cossmann, 1889

References 

 The Paleobiology Database: Trypanaxidae